The International Phonetic Alphabet (IPA) consists of more than 100 letters and diacritics. Before Unicode became widely available, several ASCII-based encoding systems of the IPA were proposed. The alphabet went through a large revision at the Kiel Convention of 1989, and the vowel symbols again in 1993. Systems devised before these revisions inevitably lack support of the additions they introduced.

Only language-neutral systems are discussed below because language-dependent ones (such as ARPABET) do not allow for a systematic comparison.

General information

Symbols
Only the symbols in the latest IPA chart are included. The numbers in the leftmost column, according to which the symbols are sorted, are the IPA Numbers. Some of the IPA symbols to which a system lacks a corresponding symbol may still be represented in that system by use of a modifier (diacritic), but such combinations are not included unless the documentation explicitly assigns one for the value.

Coverage

See also
 ARPABET
 SAMPA

Notes

References

External links
Representation of IPA with ASCII

International Phonetic Alphabet
ASCII
Computing comparisons